Melamuri is a commercial centre in Palakkad city, Kerala, India. It is an important vegetable market and acts as a gateway to the Big Bazaar for traders and buyers from other areas of the district.

History 

Melamuri has been an important junction for a few centuries. It lies on an important location on the road leading from Ponnani to Coimbatore. This place's original name was Melemuri Amsom, as mentioned in old property documents.

Important landmarks 

Important landmarks in the area include the Shree Periya Maariamman temple, vegetable market, Karuna Hospital, Melamuri Telephone exchange and Mercy College.  Melamuri is a major stop for buses plying on the Palakkad to Shornur road.

Recent developments

The Ponnani State Highway has been widened. The opening of a by-pass road at Mepparamba to Mercy college, Palakkad a few years ago has eased traffic congestion. Minibus services have been established from Melamuri to Olavakkode. Palakkad Municipality has allocated Rs. 10 lakh for constructing a bus bay in Melamuri.

References 

 
Suburbs of Palakkad
Cities and towns in Palakkad district